The Kydoniai Division was an infantry division of the Hellenic Army, active in 1920 during the Asia Minor Campaign. 

Following the Greek landing at Smyrna on 2 May 1919, and the establishment of an occupation zone in Ionia, the Kydoniai Division, named after the Greek name of the town of Ayvali, began formation in January 1920. Its core was provided by the independent 31st Infantry Regiment at Lake Doiran, the 32nd Infantry Regiment detached from the 8th Infantry Division at Ioannina, and the Smyrna Guard Regiment, which was renamed into the 33rd Infantry Regiment. Following completion of its formation in February, the division became part of the Smyrna Army Corps. The division's first and only commander was Colonel Alexandros Othonaios.

In 14–20 September, the larger part of the division was shipped to Greece to provide guards for the November 1920 elections. The units that remained behind were amalgamated with the Crete Division that was transferred to Asia Minor at the same time. Following the elections, the division returned to Asia Minor, only to be abolished: the headquarters were merged with those of the Crete Division, while the 31st and 32nd Regiments were disbanded and merged into the 33rd Regiment, which also became part of the Crete Division, which in turn was renamed as the 5th Infantry Division.

References

Sources 
 
 
 

1920 establishments in Greece
1920 disestablishments in Greece
Infantry divisions of Greece
Military units and formations established in 1920
Military units and formations of Greece in the Greco-Turkish War (1919–1922)